Major General Michael Ian Eldon Scott  (born 3 March 1941) is a retired British Army officer who took part in the Falklands War, and held the office of the Military Secretary of the British Army.

Early life
Educated at Bradfield College and the Royal Military Academy Sandhurst, Scott was commissioned into the Scots Guards in 1960.

Early military career
In 1965 he was made an equerry to the Duke of Gloucester. In 1966 he was appointed Adjutant of the 2nd Battalion Scots Guards, before in 1968 becoming Aide-de-Camp to Earl Cathcart.

In early 1981 he was appointed as the Commanding Officer of the 2nd Battalion of the Scots Guards.

Falklands War
After the invasion of the Falkland Islands by Argentina in early April 1982, in mid-June 1982 Scott commanded the victorious attack of the 2nd Battalion of the Scots Guards and supporting units at the Battle of Mount Tumbledown against positions held by the Argentinian Marines' 5th Naval Infantry Battalion, which cleared the way to Port Stanley and ended the war. At the conclusion of the campaign he was awarded the Distinguished Service Order.

Later military career
From 1984 to 1986 he commanded the 8th Infantry Brigade in Northern Ireland during Operation Banner.

In 1988 he became Deputy Military Secretary. In 1993 he was made General Officer Commanding Scotland and was Governor of Edinburgh Castle. In 1995 he was appointed to the office of Military Secretary.

Post-military life
On retiring from the British Army after thirty seven years service in 1997 he became the first lay Complaints Commissioner of the General Council of the Bar.

Publications
 In Love & War, the Lives of General Harry and Lady Smith (2008).
 Scapegoats: Thirteen victims of Military Injustice (2013).
 Surrender at New Orleans: General Sir Harry Smith in the Peninsula and America (2014).
 Royal Betrayal: The Great Baccarat Scandal of 1890. (2017).

References

 

|-
 

1941 births
Living people
People educated at Bradfield College
British Army major generals
Companions of the Order of the Bath
Commanders of the Order of the British Empire
Companions of the Distinguished Service Order
Scots Guards officers
British Army personnel of the Falklands War
Graduates of the Royal Military Academy Sandhurst
Graduates of the Staff College, Camberley
British military personnel of The Troubles (Northern Ireland)